Rhabdothamnopsis is a genus of flowering plants belonging to the family Gesneriaceae.

Its native range is Southern Central China.

Species:
 Rhabdothamnopsis sinensis Hemsl.

References

Didymocarpoideae
Gesneriaceae genera